Haltwhistle War Memorial Hospital is a health facility at Greencroft Park, Haltwhistle, Northumberland, England. It is managed by Northumbria Healthcare NHS Foundation Trust. The war memorial itself, which stands in front of the hospital, is a Grade II listed structure.

History
The original facility was built as a private home known as Greencroft House in the 18th century. It was remodeled in the early 19th century and then converted into a hospital, as a lasting memorial to soldiers who died in the First World War, in August 1922. A  maternity wing was added in 1939 and it joined the National Health Service in 1948. It was completely rebuilt to modern standards at a cost of £5.5 million in 2014.

References

External links
Official site

Hospitals established in 1922
1922 establishments in England
Hospitals in Northumberland
Haltwhistle
NHS hospitals in England